Albert Gilles (1895-1979) was a French coppersmith.

Biography
Albert Louis Gilles was born the 20th of August 1895 in France and his aunt, Palmyre Gilles, introduces him to the art of Repoussé.  For him, it rapidly became a passion, and at the age of 12 years old, he creates a lovely jewellery box for his mother.

Pursuing a commercial course by day, he takes art classes in the evening. During the First World War, Albert Gilles is injured in his right hand and he rehabilitates it by milking cows in a farm.

After the war, he resumes his artistic activities and in 1925 and 1926, he participates in and distinguishes himself at the «Salon des artistes décorateurs» in Paris.

In 1927, he emigrated to Canada and, on February 10, landed in Quebec City. In 1929,he founded the « Albert Gilles Studio » (became « Cuivres d'Art Albert Gilles » - « Albert Gilles Copper Art Studio » ). He crosses the border and works in Detroit, then Hollywood and Los Angeles, as a decorator, metal sculptor and sometimes as a silversmith.  He also restores in 1937, the damaged gates of Havana's Capitol and decides to go back to Canada.

He starts working for the church and established himself in Quebec as a religious artist. His copper reliefs and enamel murals found their place in the artistic efflorescence that marked the religious art of this period. And in 1942, he was internationally recognized when commissioned by Pope Pius XII, to execute the silver chalice offered to the archdiocese of Montreal.

His “Christorama” exhibit is devoted to the life of Christ. Albert Gilles always considered this collection of 50 silver repoussé low reliefs, his most significant work, his greatest accomplishment and the one of which he was most proud.  Started during the 1930s, it took him 15 years to achieve.  The idea of the Christorama originated in Detroit in 1932.

Aaron Mendelsohn, of General Motors, commissioned the artist to create an illustrated life of Christ in memory of his late wife. He himself died when only 40 of the reliefs had been finished and Albert Gilles decide to finish them and keep them.

Over the years and into the 1960s, he decorated more than thirty places of worship in Quebec, New Brunswick and Ontario, as well as in the United States and Jamaica. The Basilica of Sainte-Anne-de-Beaupré, the cathedrals of Cornwall (On.), Moncton (NB) and Valleyfield (Que.), a few chapels and many parish churches have one or more of his works.  

Albert Gilles died in 1979, and since then, his family continued his work, creating secular and religious pieces.

Gilles famously once said, "I am not an artist, just an artisan."

Achievements

The American years 
Gilles emigrated to the United States in early 1929, settling in Detroit. The enthusiasm sparked by the International Exhibition of Modern Decorative

and Industrial Arts in Paris in 1925 certainly helped pave the way for Gilles’ American career as a decorator. He worked for such clients as automotive

magnates Charles Fisher and Aaron Mendelsohn of the Fisher Body Company(later General Motors) and K.T. Keller of Chrysler. In 1933, he moved to

California, putting his talents to work for leading film stars like Fredric March, Mae West and Joan and Constance Bennett. He also helped decorate various

residences, for Sol M. Wurtzel, of the Fox Film Corporation, and for Walt and Roy Oliver Disney, as well as the Los Angeles Times building.

In 1957, two decades after leaving the United States, he made four massive doors in his Château-Richer workshop for the First Congregational

Church of Los Angeles. The church was designated a historic monument in 2002.

Religious art 
In 1937, ten years after first landing in Quebec, Gilles returned, settling here permanently. His copper repoussé reliefs and cloisonné enamel murals were

popular additions to the flourishing religious art scene at the time. His reputation as a religious artist and artisan was sealed with an exhibition in 1941 of

50 panels showing the life of Christ, followed in 1942 by a Papal commission to design and produce the chalice and paten for the mass celebrating Montreal's 300th anniversary.

Over the years and into the 1960s, he decorated more than thirty churches in Quebec, New Brunswick and Ontario, as well as in the United States and Jamaica.

The Sainte-Anne-de-Beaupré basilica, cathedrals in Cornwall, Ontario, Moncton, New Brunswick, and Valleyfield, Quebec, several chapels and numerous parish

churches all have one or more of Gilles’ copper, brass or silver repoussé pieces. His relief work also adorns many doors, architectural elements (capitals and

columns), church fittings (altars, railings, pulpits, baptismal fonts and tabernacles), and other ceremonial accessories (Paschal candlesticks and sanctuary lamps). In

other cases, his reliefs depict scenes representing the fourteen stations of the cross or holy figures, and in yet others they are joined to form murals.

Today is tradition is perpetuated by his family.

1895 births
1979 deaths
French coppersmiths
Metalsmiths from Paris